was a planned battleship of the Imperial Japanese Navy. The battleships would have been armed with ten  guns and bring Japan closer to its goal of an "Eight-four" fleet (eight battleships and four battlecruisers). All work on the ship was halted after the Washington Naval Conference and the signing of the Washington Naval Treaty. As the vessel had to be destroyed in accordance with the terms of the treaty, the incomplete Tosa was then subjected to tests to gauge the effect of Japanese weaponry before being scuttled on 9 February 1925.

Design and construction

Designed by Yuzuru Hiraga, Tosa was intended to be part of a Japanese "Eight-four fleet", comprising eight battleships and four battlecruisers, the successor to the proposed "Eight-eight fleet". Tosa and her sister ship  were intended to be the second set of high-speed battleships (after the ) under the plan, and were approved for construction in the Diet's 14 July 1917 warship-building authorization. Engineering blueprints for the two ships were completed by Japanese naval engineers in 1919. Based on Japanese studies of the British experience at the Battle of Jutland, the ships were to include new features over previous designs, including higher steaming speed despite increased tonnage, flush decks, and inclined armor.

Tosa was laid down on 16 February 1920 by Mitsubishi in Nagasaki (at the Nagasaki Shipyard & Machinery Works). She utilized the same slipway where, two decades later, the   would be built. Tosa was originally scheduled to be launched in October 1921, but multiple strikes delayed it until November. Ultimately, the battleship was not launched until 18 December 1921, two months behind schedule. Fitting-out commenced soon after with a projected completion date of July 1922. Work on Tosa was halted on 5 February 1922, one day before Japan signed the Washington Naval Treaty. Under the terms of the treaty, construction of Tosa and Kaga was formally canceled on 5 May 1922.

Career

In August 1922, Tosa was moved to Kure, still incomplete. Fifty thousand people turned out to watch as the battleship was towed out of the harbor by five tugboats. The barbettes for the 406 mm (16 inch) guns were in place, but no turrets or weapons had been mounted, so the holes in the main deck were covered with a mesh-like material. Her hull was finished, and a superstructure deck, bridge deck and conning tower had been fitted, along with a light signal mast directly aft of the second barbette. The conning tower had to be outfitted as a bridge, as there was no other suitable location; compared with those of similar ships, it was much smaller, as it contained only two levels and bridge wings. An exhaust pipe resembling an extremely small funnel was fitted so heat could be supplied within the ship. Her guns were turned over to the Imperial Japanese Army for use as coastal artillery; one of her main gun turrets was installed near Busan, Korea, in 1930 and another on Tsushima Island in 1933. The rest of her guns were placed in reserve and ultimately scrapped in 1943.

Tosa remained in Kure until mid-1924. Stricken on 1 April 1924, the ship—with her hull virtually finished—was designated for use in testing the effectiveness of shells and torpedoes against its armor arrangements. As a result, in June 1924 the navy's gunnery school took possession of the hull and prepared it for testing.

Test target
During 6–13 June, Tosa was subjected to five explosions. The first involved a  Mk.

The second and fifth test charges (8 and 13 June) were both placed near the fore main battery magazines. Both broached the side protection system—allowing 1,008 and 726 long tons (1,024 and 738 t) of water, respectively, to enter the ship—showing that the usual three-compartment, all-void system used in most Japanese battleships was an insufficient defense against modern torpedoes. The list incurred during test two was a ° 16' change, resulting in a port list of ° 36'; for test five these numbers were ° 38' and a starboard list of ° 48'.

Similar to two and five, tests three and four were conducted at the same frame (192) but on opposite sides. Frame 192 was in the middle of the ship, where the ship's protection system was designed to be the strongest. The tests ruptured 15 and 26 m2 (160 and 280 sq ft), dished in 160 and 110 m2 (1,700 and 1,200 sq ft) of plating, and allowed 1,203 and 1,160 long tons (1,222 and 1,180 t) of water to enter the ship. Test three allowed in the most water of all the tests and, as a result, the list was altered from a previous port-side ° 51' to a starboard-side ° 22'—a change of ° 13'. Test four went from a starboard ° 0' to a port ° 20'.

Further tests included the explosion of several Type 8 torpedoes filled with 300–346 kg (660–760 lbs) of picric acid within Tosas designed magazine for them, which was located forward of the first turret and had been considered a weak point in previous battleship designs. This caused "extreme structural damage above the waterline" to Tosa, and confirmed that any problem in that part of the ship could seriously harm it. Possible solutions included the installation of additional armor over the room or the use of walls on one side of the magazine that would be blown out and away from the ship in the event of any serious explosion inside. This would have the effect of focusing the explosion outside, minimizing structural damage to the ship itself.

Another test conducted around this time involved a  gun firing a shell at Tosa. The result was disturbing, as the shell was able to pass through the  armor and explode in the port engine room. As a result,  of water was let in, and Tosas list was increased from ° 53' to ° 06'.

Results of the tests on Tosa were subsequently used in the refitting and reconstruction of existing warships. Lessons learned were also incorporated into the designs of the two  super-battleships ten years later. In the latter, this meant that the side belt armor was continued below the waterline and beneath the torpedo bulge so that the class would have a defense against underwater shells.

Sinking

For the next few months, Tosa was given to the Hiroshima gunnery school for use as a target. On 14 January 1925, the Navy Ministry of Japan ordered Tosa to be scuttled within one month's time. To ensure this, the Commander in Chief of the Kure Naval District directed that preparations for scuttling the ship be completed by 1 February. Later that month, the United States Office of Naval Intelligence reported that "work on the dismantling of [Tosa] has been going on at the Kure Naval Arsenal and everything possible has been removed. The intention is to fill her hull with sand and gravel, tow her out to deep water near the entrance to Kure, open her sea cocks, and send her to the bottom."

Tosa was brought from Kure on 3 February to Saiki Bay in the Bungo Channel. She was then towed from the bay on the 6th with the intention of bringing the battleship to the designated sinking spot, but were thwarted by a strong storm and returned. A second attempt was made at 10:00 on the 8th. They would be detonated using electrical fuses, though time fuses were also fitted for use if the sea was calm. The explosives were triggered on the 8th, but they failed, so a contingent was sent aboard Tosa on the 9th; they opened six Kingston valves in the engine room at about 01:25. Soon after, Tosa slowly began to sink by the stern and to starboard. By 03:50, the rate increased, and the ship slipped beneath the waves by 07:00. Tosa was the tenth and final Japanese capital ship sunk or scrapped to comply with the naval treaty's stipulations.

See also

 Hashima Island, also known as Gunkanjima ("Battleship Island"), received its nickname from an apparent resemblance to Tosa

Notes

References

Bibliography

 
 
 
 Friedman, Norman. "Japan" in 
 "Appendix A; The Tosa Experiments" in 

 
 
 
 
   (contact the editor at lars.ahlberghalmstad.mail.postnet.se for subscription information)

Further reading 
 

Tosa-class battleships
Ships built by Mitsubishi Heavy Industries
1921 ships
Ships sunk as targets
Shipwrecks in the Pacific Ocean
Maritime incidents in 1925